Franz Schitzhofer (born 28 October 1958) is an Austrian sports shooter. He competed at the 1976 Summer Olympics and the 1980 Summer Olympics.

References

1958 births
Living people
Austrian male sport shooters
Olympic shooters of Austria
Shooters at the 1976 Summer Olympics
Shooters at the 1980 Summer Olympics
20th-century Austrian people